Pryvitne is a small village in western Ukraine, in the Volodymyr Raion of Volyn Oblast, but was formerly administered within Lokachi Raion. It is located approximately 75 miles northeast of the city of Lviv, Ukraine. In the past it was a town of Świniuchy ( Svyniukhy,  Svinekh).

History

Judaism in Swiniuchy

Jews first settled here in the 16th century. By the year 1897, 629 Jews lived here out of a total of 1,780 people. During World War I, many Jews left the shtetl because of nearby fighting. In 1921, only 173 Jews were living here.

Due to a high birth rate, as most of the Jewish citizens of Świniuchy belonged to the orthodox sects of Olyka and Tuczyn Hasidism, the Jewish population grew to 498 by 1936. In July 1941, the Ukrainian local government police persecuted the Jews of Świniuchy after being ordered to by the Nazi invaders. During October of that year, they were sent to the Lokachi ghetto where they were executed on September 13, 1942. The diary of Michael Diment, the only known survivor of the liquidation of the Jewish population of Swiniuchy is  a moving account of the last days of the community. See Michael Diment, The Lone Survivor: A Diary of the Lukacze Ghetto and Svyniukhy, Ukraine (1992), published by the Holocaust Library in New York.

There are known descendants of the Jews of Świniuchy living in the United States.
Specifically there were former Swiniuchy residents and their descendants who settled in the area of Detroit and Flint Michigan, along with branches of those families scattered in Pittsburgh PA, Toledo OH, and Baltimore, Maryland, and New York City. Very early in its history, the Baltimore community formed a landesmanschaft (organization of Jews from a particular area in Europe) known as the Swiniche Woliner (Volhynya) Benevolent Association, which persists to this day.  An extensive family tree of the Schafer family (which comes from Swiniuchy) can be found at http://www.schaferfamily.org. There are also descendants of this family living in Israel.

Life in Pre-War Swiniuchy

Swiniuchy was an old town with a laid-back feel. As typical of the region, homes were decaying rustic whitewashed clay huts lit by kerosene lamps. The village was, of course, centered on trade. Poles, Ukrainians, and Jews alike shared the small shtetl, living together, though with suspicions. Food was cheap, most of the Jews were observant, and basically all of them were below the poverty line. Also, there was no generation gap, as it was such a small, close-knitted community. Homes were worn, white clay, with thatched roofs.

See also 

History of Jews in Ukraine
Ashkenazi Jews
Pale of Settlement
Holocaust

References

External links 
 http://www.kimel.net/podhajce.html

Volhynian Voivodeship (1569–1795)
Holocaust locations in Ukraine
Villages in Volodymyr Raion